Caleb Snyder Martin (February 10, 1924 – September 10, 1994) was an American football tackle who played one season with the Chicago Cardinals of the National Football League. He played college football at Louisiana Tech University and attended Franklin Parish High School in Winnsboro, Louisiana.

References

External links
Just Sports Stats

1924 births
1994 deaths
Players of American football from Louisiana
American football tackles
Louisiana Tech Bulldogs football players
Chicago Cardinals players
People from Winnsboro, Louisiana